This is a list of events in animation in 2023.

Events

January 
 January 4: Season 2 of Star Wars: The Bad Batch premiered on Disney+.
 January 8: Shion Takeuchi announced on Twitter that her series Inside Job had been cancelled by Netflix, despite already having previously been renewed for a second season the previous June.
 January 9: Koala Man premiered on Hulu.
 January 11: SuperKitties premiered on Disney Junior.
 January 12: 
 Velma, an adult-oriented show based on the Scooby-Doo franchise, premiered on HBO Max to mixed reviews from critics, but was panned by audiences.
 Justin Roiland, co-creator of Rick and Morty and Solar Opposites, and voice of Earl of Lemongrab on Adventure Time, Blendin Blandin on Gravity Falls, and Oscar on Fish Hooks, was charged with felony domestic violence and false imprisonment in Orange County, California in connection with a 2020 incident toward an unnamed woman he was reportedly dating. After the charges were laid, multiple people came forward with their own allegations of abuse by Roiland, including claims of predatory behavior towards minors. Roiland would resign from Squanch Games on January 16.
 January 13: Hamish Steele, creator of Dead End: Paranormal Park, announced that Netflix had cancelled the series.
 January 21: The Owl House special "For the Future" premiered on Disney Channel.
 January 24: Adult Swim announced that month that Roiland had been dismissed from Rick and Morty and on January 25, 20th Television confirmed that he had also been removed from Solar Opposites and Koala Man.

February 
 February 1: Season 2 of The Proud Family: Louder and Prouder premiered on Disney+.
 February 6: Work It Out Wombats! premiered on PBS Kids.
 February 10: Moon Girl and Devil Dinosaur premiered on Disney Channel.
 February 16: The fifth and final season of Aggretsuko premiered on Netflix.
 February 17: The third and final season of Animaniacs premiered on Hulu.
 February 24: The second season of Oddballs premiered on Netflix.

March 
 March 10: Kiff premiered on Disney Channel.
 March 12: 95th Academy Awards
 Guillermo del Toro's Pinocchio, directed by Guillermo del Toro and Mark Gustafson, won the Academy Award for Best Animated Feature.
 The Boy, the Mole, the Fox and the Horse, directed by Peter Baynton and Charlie Mackesy, won the Academy Award for Best Animated Short Film.
 March 17: The Magician's Elephant was released on Netflix.
 March 20: The seventh season of Gabby's Dollhouse will premiere on Netflix.
 March 24: The final episode of Pokemon Ultimate Journeys will premiere. It will mark the last appearances of Ash Ketchum and his Pikachu.

April 
 April 5: Illumination's The Super Mario Bros. Movie will be released.
 April 8: The series finale of The Owl House, "Watching and Dreaming", will premiere on Disney Channel.
 April 9: The third half of the third season of Bluey will premiere.
 April 21: The second Bluey soundtrack album titled, "Dance Mode!", will release.

June 
 June 2: Sony Pictures Animation's Spider-Man: Across the Spider-Verse will be released.
 June 16: Pixar's Elemental will be released.
 June 30: Dreamworks's Ruby Gillman, Teenage Kraken will be released.

July 
 July 14: Studio Ghibli's How Do You Live? will be released.

August 
 August 4: Paramount Animation's Teenage Mutant Ninja Turtles: Mutant Mayhem will be released.

September 
 September 29: PAW Patrol: The Mighty Movie will be released.

November 
 November 22: Walt Disney Animation Studios’ Wish will be released.

Awards
 Academy Award for Best Animated Feature: Guillermo del Toro's Pinocchio
 Academy Award for Best Animated Short Film: The Boy, the Mole, the Fox and the Horse
 American Cinema Editors Award for Best Edited Animated Feature Film: Guillermo del Toro's Pinocchio
 Annecy International Animated Film Festival Cristal du long métrage: Little Nicholas – Happy as Can Be
 Annie Award for Best Animated Feature: Guillermo del Toro's Pinocchio
 Annie Award for Best Animated Feature — Independent: Marcel the Shell with Shoes On
 BAFTA Award for Best Animated Film: Guillermo del Toro's Pinocchio
 César Award for Best Animated Film: My Sunny Maad
 Chicago Film Critics Association Award for Best Animated Film: Guillermo del Toro's Pinocchio
 Critics' Choice Movie Award for Best Animated Feature: Guillermo del Toro's Pinocchio
 Dallas–Fort Worth Film Critics Association Award for Best Animated Film: Guillermo del Toro's Pinocchio
 European Film Award for Best Animated Feature Film: No Dogs or Italians Allowed
 Florida Film Critics Circle Award for Best Animated Film: Turning Red
 Golden Globe Award for Best Animated Feature Film: Guillermo del Toro's Pinocchio
 Golden Reel Award for Outstanding Achievement in Sound Editing – Sound Effects, Foley, Dialogue and ADR for Animated Feature Film: Guillermo del Toro's Pinocchio
 Goya Award for Best Animated Film: Unicorn Wars
 Japan Academy Film Prize for Animation of the Year: The First Slam Dunk
 Kids' Choice Award for Favorite Animated Movie: Minions: The Rise of Gru
 Los Angeles Film Critics Association Award for Best Animated Film: Guillermo del Toro's Pinocchio
 Mainichi Film Award for Best Animation Film: Takano Intersection
 Minnesota Film Critics Alliance Award for Best Animated Feature: Puss in Boots: The Last Wish
 National Board of Review Award for Best Animated Film: Marcel the Shell with Shoes On
 New York Film Critics Circle Award for Best Animated Film: Marcel the Shell with Shoes On
 Online Film Critics Society Award for Best Animated Film: Guillermo del Toro's Pinocchio
 Producers Guild of America Award for Best Animated Motion Picture: Guillermo del Toro's Pinocchio
 San Diego Film Critics Society Award for Best Animated Film: Guillermo del Toro's Pinocchio
 San Francisco Film Critics Circle Award for Best Animated Feature: Guillermo del Toro's Pinocchio
 Satellite Award for Best Animated or Mixed Media Feature: Marcel the Shell with Shoes On
 Saturn Award for Best Animated Film: Marcel the Shell with Shoes On
 St. Louis Gateway Film Critics Association Award for Best Animated Film: Marcel the Shell with Shoes On
 Tokyo Anime Award: One Piece Film: Red
 Toronto Film Critics Association Award for Best Animated Film: Turning Red
 Visual Effects Society Award for Outstanding Visual Effects in an Animated Feature: Guillermo del Toro's Pinocchio
 Washington D.C. Area Film Critics Association Award for Best Animated Feature: Guillermo del Toro's Pinocchio

Films released

Television series debuts

Television series endings

Deaths

January 
 January 6: Earl Boen, American actor (voice of Red Skull and the Beyonder in Spider-Man, Santa Claus in A Pinky and the Brain Christmas, Leonard Kanifky in Bonkers, Rhino in Batman: The Animated Series, Simon Stagg in the Justice League episode "Metamorphosis", William Howard Taft in the Time Squad episode "White House Weirdness", continued voice of Senor Senior Sr. in Kim Possible), dies from lung cancer at age 81.
 January 7: Adam Rich, American actor (voice of Presto in Dungeons & Dragons), dies at age 54.
January 11:
 Carole Cook, American actress (voice of Pearl Gesner in Home on the Range), dies at age 98.
 Charles Kimbrough, American actor (voice of Victor in The Hunchback of Notre Dame and The Hunchback of Notre Dame II, Mort Chalk in Recess: School's Out, Rainbow Face #1 in The Land Before Time VII: The Stone of Cold Fire, Dr. Bob in the Mighty Max episode "Scorpio Rising", Sandy Dreckman in the Pinky and the Brain episode "You'll Never Eat Food Pellets in This Town Again!", Jim Dial in the Family Guy episode "A Picture is Worth $1,000 Bucks", Stage Gordon in the Batman Beyond episode "Out of the Past", Pat Jensen in The Zeta Project episode "On the Wire", narrator in The Angry Beavers episode "Canucks Amuck", additional voices in Whisper of the Heart), dies at age 86.
 January 18: David Crosby, American singer, guitarist, and songwriter (voiced himself in The Simpsons episodes "Marge in Chains" and "Homer's Barbershop Quartet"), dies at age 81.
 January 22: Bill Dennis, American animation executive (founder of Toonz Media Group), dies at age 80.
 January 25: Cindy Williams, American actress and producer (voice of Shirley Feeney in Laverne & Shirley in the Army, Gerri Poveri in The Magic School Bus episode "Ups and Downs"), dies at age 75.

February 
 February 11: Austin Majors, American actor (voice of young Jim Hawkins in Treasure Planet, Blue Teammate #3 in The Ant Bully, Thomas in the American Dad! episode "Of Ice and Men"), dies at age 27.
 February 12: David Jude Jolicoeur, American musician and member of De La Soul (voiced himself in the Teen Titans Go! episode "Don't Press Play"), dies at age 54.
 February 13: Leiji Matsumoto, Japanese animator and manga artist (Space Battleship Yamato, Galaxy Express 999, Space Pirate Captain Harlock, Queen Emeraldas, Queen Millennia, worked with the band Daft Punk on their animated music videos and their full-length film Interstella 5555: The 5tory of the 5ecret 5tar 5ystem), dies at age 85.
 February 15: Dario Penne, Italian actor (Italian dub voice of Bender in Futurama, Finn McMissile in Cars 2, Agent K in Men in Black: The Series, and Django in Ratatouille), dies at age 84.
 February 19: Jansen Panettiere, American actor (voice of Truman X in The X's, Periwinkle in season 6 of Blue's Clues, young Rodney Copperbottom in Robots, Shovelmouth Boy in Ice Age: The Meltdown), dies at age 28.
 February 24: Walter Mirisch, American film producer (The Pink Panther), dies at age 101.
 February 25: Gordon Pinsent, Canadian actor, writer, director and singer (voice of the title character in Babar, Babar: The Movie, Babar: King of the Elephants and Babar and the Adventures of Badou, Captain Efraim Longstocking in Pippi Longstocking, Harry Freelove, The Barber in Pirate's Passage), dies at age 92.
 February 27: Burny Mattinson, American writer, director, and animator (Walt Disney Animation Studios), dies at age 87.

March

 March 3: Tom Sizemore, American actor (voice of Rex Mason / Metamorpho in the Justice League episode "Metamorphosis"), dies at age 61.
 March 7: Ian Falconer, American author and illustrator (creator of Olivia), dies at age 63.
 March 13: Rolly Crump, American animator and designer (Walt Disney Company), dies at age 93.
 March 17: 
 Lance Reddick, American actor (voice of General Lunaris in DuckTales, Falcon in The Avengers: Earth's Mightiest Heroes, Cutler in Tron: Uprising, Ra's al Ghul in Beware the Batman, Agent Clappers in Paradise PD, Alan Rails in the Rick and Morty episode "Vindicators 3: The Return of Worldender"), dies at age 60.
 Raoul Servais, Belgian animator, animated film director and comic artist (Chromophobia, Harpya), dies at age 94.

See also
 2023 in anime
 List of animated television series of 2023

References

External links 
Animated works of the year, listed in the IMDb

 
Mass media timelines by year